Caprock is an unincorporated community in Lea County, New Mexico, United States. Caprock is located on a geological formation in the high plains, approximately 47 miles east of Roswell. U.S. Route 380 passes through the community. It was founded by Edward Crossland, who planted the cottonwoods in the area, in 1913. A post office was established in 1916 but is closed. Caprock's school closed in 1927.  Caprock today consists solely of a country store (without gasoline service), two ranches, and a TV transmission tower.  The ZIP Code for Caprock is 88213.

Points of interest
 KOBR-TV Tower

References

Unincorporated communities in New Mexico
Unincorporated communities in Lea County, New Mexico